The following is a list of European ice hockey arenas by capacity. Only those arenas that currently and regularly host ice hockey games with paid admission (e.g. professional, major junior, or university) and have regular seating capacity over 10,000 are included. Outdoor stadiums that have hosted occasional hockey games are not included.

European ice hockey arenas by capacity

See also
List of NHL arenas
List of indoor arenas in Europe
List of ice hockey arenas by capacity

European